Martha Pennock House is a set of two historic homes located in East Fallowfield Township, Chester County, Pennsylvania. The older house was built about 1825 as the Ironmaster's mansion by Martha Pennock, widow of Isaac Pennock, for her son Isaac.  It is a two-story, five bay, stuccoed stone Federal style dwelling.  The second house was built about 1840, and is a two-story, four bay, stuccoed stone Greek Revival style dwelling.  It features a full width front verandah.  The mill complex where the houses are located was the home of Rebecca Lukens (1794–1854), daughter of Martha Pennock, for a short time after her marriage to Charles Lukens.

It was added to the National Register of Historic Places in 1985.

References

Houses on the National Register of Historic Places in Pennsylvania
Federal architecture in Pennsylvania
Greek Revival houses in Pennsylvania
Houses completed in 1825
Houses completed in 1840
Houses in Chester County, Pennsylvania
National Register of Historic Places in Chester County, Pennsylvania